The Gendarmerie and Coast Guard Academy is an academy for the training of personnel of the Turkish Gendarmerie and the Turkish Coast Guard located in Ankara, Turkey. School was found in the 31st July 2016, but symbolically 1904 is being accepted. Director of the school is Brigadier General Murat Bulut since 2020.

References 

Coast Guard Command (Turkey)
Gendarmerie (Turkey)